Canarium muelleri, commonly named scrub turpentine or mangobark, is a species of Australian rainforest trees in the plant family Burseraceae. They are endemic to northeastern Queensland, widespread in the rainforests of the Wet Tropics region, and further south to the Conway Range area, near Proserpine, Queensland.

Each fruit contains a hard–shelled seed.

These trees formal description using this species name was published in 1890 by Frederick M. Bailey, Queensland colonial botanist from 1881 to 1915.

References

External links

muelleri
Flora of Queensland
Sapindales of Australia